HS Timber Group is an Austrian private company operating in the wood processing industry, lumber trading and bioenergy production. 

HS Timber Group has been active in Romania since 2002 and opened its first sawmill in 2003. Nowadays the company is leading in European woodworking business, employs more than 3.500 people in Romania, Czech Republic, Bulgaria, Germany, Finland and Ukraine. Another sawmill project is currently under construction in Argentina.

History

17th to 20th century 
For the Schweighofer family wood working has a long tradition, which was handed over from generation to generation. The first related remark in official documents was made in the year 1642. The actual success story started in 1956, when Franz and Maria Schweighofer took over the family owned saw mill in Brand, Lower Austria. At that time the annual mill capacity was about 1.000 m³.

Gerald Schweighofer started his career in the company in 1975. Due to his innovative spirit and his readiness to assume a risk, he opened the worldwide unique profiling line for small diameter logs at the headquarters in Brand/Austria, in 1977.
Holzindustrie Schweighofer opened Europe's largest saw mill (at that time - 1984) in Ybbs an der Donau/Austria.

After take over and enlargement the saw mill in Sollenau/Austria started processing in 1991. Holzindustrie Schweighofer took over the biggest and most modern saw mill in Zdirec in the Czech Republic (1996).

After taking over the saw mill Bad St. Leonhard/Austria, in 1997, and another saw mill in Plana/Czech Republic, Holzindustrie Schweighofer reached a total sawing capacity of 3 Mio. m³ in six different mills. Moreover, the glue lam mill Lamco was built in cooperation with the Japanese company Maiken and the Schweighofer Privatstiftung was founded.

Holzindustrie Schweighofer merged with Enso Timber, in 1998, and became the third largest saw milling company in the world. The
Schweighofer family sold its shares and hence all sawmills in Austria and the Czech Republic to Stora Enso Timber (2001).

In 2011, the Schweighofer Group bought the M-real Hallein GmbH in Austria. In September 2017, the Schweighofer Group sold the plant in Hallein to TowerBrook Capital Partners, which intends to keep the pulp dissolving mill in full operations. Schweighofer explained this move with increasing its focus on its core business of sawmilling.

History in Romania 

In 2003 Holzindustrie Schweighofer started production in the new and modern sawmill in Sebeş, Romania
In 2008 after finalization the second saw mill in Rădăuți started operations
In 2009 the Romanian Swedwood manufactory was taken over in Siret, close (12 km) to the second mill in Rădăuți. After the modernization and enlargement of the factory solid wood panels have been produced there
 Since 2010 Holzindustrie Schweighofer BACO produces blockboards and concrete formwork panels in the previous Finnforest factory in Comăneşti
 In 2015 evidence emerged of widespread destruction of virgin forests by Holzindustrie Schweighofer suppliers. It was alleged that Holzindustrie Schweighofer was fully aware that the wood they were sourcing was illegally logged.
 In 2017 the company introduced an action plan for a sustainable timber industry and transparent supply chains in Romania. Its core measure is the GPS tracking system "Timflow".
 In January 2022, the company announced the partial closure of two plants in Romania. As of 30 March 2022, operations at the sawmill in Radauti and the glue-laminated timber board plant in Siret were discontinued.

Production units 
HS Tmber Group operates at present 4 production units in Romania: Two sawmills in Sebeș and Reci (county Covasna) and two factories for blockboard and glue lam products in Comănești and Radauti. In 2015 the company bought another sawmill in Kodersdorf in Germany from the Klausner Group. In 2022 HS Timber Group took over the Finnish sawmill in Luvia. Another sawmill is under construction in Argentina.

Sawmill Sebeș 

The sawmill in Sebeș (700 employees) was Schweighofer's first factory in Romania and started operations in 2003. According to the company, the annual cutting capacity is 1,45 million m³.

Sawmill Rădăuți 

The second Schweighofer factory in Romania (600 employees) was opened in 2008. The sawmill was closed in 2022. The post and beam production is still in operation.

Sawmill Reci 
The sawmill in Reci, Covasna County, commenced operations in August 2015, following a 150 million
euro investment. The production unit spans over 70 hectares and has a cutting capacity of 800.000 m3 round wood. The factory employs 650.

Sawmill Kodersdorf 
In 2015 the Schweighofer Group took over the sawmill in Kodersdorf (Germany) from the Klausner Group, which will do business under the name of Holzindustrie Schweighofer GmbH. Operations were transferred in October 2015. All employees were hired by Holzindustrie Schweighofer. The factory processes spruce and pine. Its annual cutting capacity is 1.2 million m³ of logs.

Blockboard factory Comănești 

In 2010 Schweighofer took over the blockboard production factory from Finnforest in Comănești. With 750 employees and its annual production volume (135.000 m³ blockboards) it is the world's largest blockboard production in one location.

Sawmill Luvia 
In April 2022, HS Timber Group took over the Finnish sawmill Luvian Saha Oy. The company in the west of Finland has been operating since 1976, employs around 120 people, and has a plant size of 19.6 ha. The mill cuts and processes needlesawn roundwood, 70% of which is spruce and 30% pine.

Sawmill Project Argentina (under construction) 
HS Timber Group is building a new sawmill in Gobernador Virasoro in Argentina in a joint venture with the Belgian company Forestcape. The groundbreaking ceremony was in December 2021. The investment is worth around USD 100 million. The joint venture is called Acon Timber.

Kolomyia (plot) 
In Kolomyja in Ukraine, the HS Timber Group had plans to build a new sawmill on an area of 35 ha. The project is not being pursued any further at present.

Former Production Sites

Edge glued panels factory Siret 

The edge glued panels factory in Siret was taken over from the IKEA-subsidiary company Swedwood in 2009. 260 employees are working there. 70.000 m³ of finished products and 20.000 t of briquettes are produced annually. Operations were discontinued as of 30 March 2022.

Business areas 

The core areas of business of Schweighofer Group are:
Production and processing of wood products
Production of bioenergy
Trade of wood products
Forestry
Real estate

Wood industry 
The key business of HS Timber Group is the wood industry with factories in Romania, Germany and Finland. Besides classic sawmills, HS Timber Group also runs two wood working factories. Main products are timber, construction and packaging timber, planed (semi)finished timber, glue lam products, finger jointed products, blockboards, concrete formwork panels, pellets and briquettes.

Bioenergy production 
Schweighofer Group runs four bioenergy power plants in Romania. In these CHP (cogeneration heat and power plants) barks, wood shavings and wood chips are used for the generation of energy. Schweighofer is also share holder of the biomass power plant in Suceava, Romania.

Timber trade 
Schweighofer holds 25.1% of the shares of the wood trading company DABG. Timber trading activities – focussing on North Africa and Middle East - are done by this subsidiary company.

Viscose pulp production 
Since 2013 Schweighofer Fiber (Hallein, Salzburg, Austria) has been producing high quality viscose pulp, that is used for the production of e. g. textiles. 240 employees produce 150.000 tons of viscose pulp (for viscose fiber and nitrocellulose).

The production of viskose pulp influenced the economic location Hallein. In 2015 the pulp factory celebrated its 125th anniversary. Besides pulp production the company today is into bio-energy and long-distance heating as well.125 Jahre Zellulose: Halleins ganzer Stolz feiert The location is being modernised. An example is the new automatic loading terminal, which is used by traders e. g. of pellets since May 2015. The storage capacity is 1.000t and the annual handling capacity is 40.000t of pellets.

In 2017, the Schweighofer Group sold its plant in Hallein to TowerBrook Capital Partners.

Forestry 
Holzindustry Schweighofer owned forests in the Czech Republic and Romania until 2018. They were managed by qualified forestry experts according to the principles of near-natural and sustainable forestry. In Romania however Schweighofer is mentioned in attacking Retezat National Park. Contrary to this statement, Holzindustrie Schweighofer claims it has taken concrete steps to protect old-growth forests, including in Campusel (Retezat Mountains). 

In March 2018, the Schweighofer Group sold its Romanian forests to the Swedish GreenGold Group.

Real estate 
Schweighofer Group develops and runs real estate projects in inner cities of Austria and Canada.

Controversy 
On May 22, 2014 a public letter from Ukrainian ecological organization Kyiv Ecology and Culture Center appeared indicating that construction of wood processing factory in Ivano-Frankivsk region of Ukraine would require 500 000 tons of gravel to be excavated from local river beds, thus threatening Carpathian ecology. Ecologists have never received any response from company officials.
The Environmental Investigation Agency (EIA) in 2015, releases their investigation of illegal logging in Romania. The report implicates Schweighofer as a major promoter and recipient of the destruction of Carpathian old growth forests. A comprehensive documentary released by Organized Crime and Corruption Reporting Project and RISE Project follows the illegal harvested wood in Romania.

On Feb 17, 2017, Forest Stewardship Council has disassociated itself from the company because of the company involvement in the purchasing and trading of illegally harvested timber in Romania and that this is having a negative impact on the country's natural protected areas. In the summer of 2017, FSC launched a stakeholder process in Romania, which sets out the conditions under which Holzindustrie Schweighofer may return to FSC.

In response to criticism, the company has presented an action plan for a sustainable timber industry in Romania. Its core measure is the self-developed GPS tracking system "Timflow". HS Timber Group records the route of all trucks that deliver saw logs to its sawmills. This data, together with photos of the loaded trucks, is publicly available at timflow.com. HS Timber Group wants to prove with this data that it does not receive wood of illegal origin and also adheres to its voluntary commitment not to accept wood from national parks.

An investigation in 2018 by Environmental Investigation Agency found that the company was continuing to buy wood from third party suppliers which comes from Romania's national parks. Holzindustrie Schweighofer publicly, strongly rejected these allegations. Moreover, the company has made a voluntary commitment not to process any wood originating from national parks. This commitment also includes areas of national parks (“buffer zones”) where harvesting is explicitly permitted by law.

In November 2021, the FSC announced the end of the disassociation and confirmed that HS Timber Group had met all requirements. The blockboard plant in Comanesti, Romania, was recertified again by FSC in January 2022.

Further reading
Leutgeb, Rupert: Franz Schweighofer. 80 de ani de aur. Nord Forest Edition, Viena 2008

References

External links
 HS Timber Group: www.hs.at

Companies based in Bucharest
Forest products companies